Constance Anne Wilson ( – 8 January 2023) was a British food historian.

Early life and education
Wilson was a Cambridge Classics graduate with a London postgraduate diploma in the Archaeology of the Iron Age and the Roman Provinces.

Career
In 1961, Wilson was appointed an Assistant Librarian in the Brotherton Library at the University of Leeds.  She was subject librarian for classics, archaeology, and ancient history, to which she subsequently added art and music. In the mid-1960s she catalogued the John Preston collection of historic cookery books (at the time a recent gift to the Library), which led to her developing an interest in food history. She published the wide-ranging Food and Drink in Britain in 1973, and her more specialised The Book of Marmalade: its antecedents, its history and its rôle in the world today won the 1984 Diagram Prize for the oddest title of the year at the Frankfurt Book Fair. In 2006 she published Water of Life: a history of wine-distilling and spirits; 500 BC - AD 2000. She edited several volumes of the proceedings of the Leeds Symposium on Food History and Tradition.

Wilson retired from Leeds in 1992.

Death
Wilson died on 8 January 2023, at the age of 95.

Works
1973: Food and Drink in Britain from the Stone Age to Recent Times. London: Constable 
1984: Philosophers, iōsis and Water of Life. Leeds: Leeds Philosophical and Literary Society
1985: The Book of Marmalade: its antecedents, its history and its rôle in the world today, together with a collection of recipes for marmalades & marmalade cookery.  London: Constable 
2006: Water of Life: a history of wine-distilling and spirits from 500 BC - AD 2000. Totnes: Prospect Books

As editor
1991: "Banquetting stuffe": the fare and social background of the Tudor and Stuart banquet (Proceedings of the 1st Leeds Symposium on Food History and Traditions). Edinburgh: Edinburgh UP 
1991: The Appetite and the Eye: visual aspects of food and its presentation within their historic context (Proceedings of the 2nd Leeds Symposium on Food History and Traditions). Edinburgh: Edinburgh UP 
1991: Traditional Food East and West of the Pennines (Proceedings of the 3rd Leeds Symposium on Food History and Traditions), Edinburgh UP, 1991 
1991: Waste Not, Want Not: food preservation from early times to the present day. Edinburgh: Edinburgh UP 
1993: "Liquid Nourishment": potable foods and stimulating drinks (Proceedings of the 5th Leeds Symposium on Food History and Traditions). Edinburgh: Edinburgh UP 
1993: Food for the community : special diets for special groups (Proceedings of the 6th Leeds Symposium on Food History and Traditions). Edinburgh: Edinburgh UP 
1993: Traditional Country House Cooking. London: Weidenfeld & Nicolson 
1994: Luncheon, Nuncheon and Other Meals: eating with the Victorians.  Stroud: Sutton 
2004: Eating with the Victorians. Stroud: Sutton (Previous ed. published as: Luncheon, nuncheon and other meals, 1994.)
1998: The Country House Kitchen Garden, 1600-1950: how produce was grown and how it was used (Based on papers from the 10th Leeds Symposium on Food History and Traditions). Stroud: Sutton

References

1920s births
Year of birth missing
2023 deaths
English food writers
Social historians
People associated with the University of Leeds
Alumni of the University of Cambridge
Alumni of the University of London
Academic librarians